Gajoldoba or Gojaldoba is a village in the Mal CD block in the Malbazar subdivision of the Jalpaiguri district in the state of West Bengal, India.

Geography

Location

Area overview
Gorumara National Park has overtaken traditionally popular Jaldapara National Park in footfall and Malbazar has emerged as one of the most important towns in the Dooars. Malbazar subdivision is presented in the map alongside. It is a predominantly rural area with 88.62% of the population living in rural areas and 11.32% living in the urban areas. Tea gardens in the Dooars and Terai regions produce 226 million kg or over a quarter of India's total tea crop.  Some tea gardens were identified in the 2011 census as census towns or villages. Such places are marked in the map as CT (census town) or R (rural/ urban centre). Specific tea estate pages are marked TE.

Note: The map alongside presents some of the notable locations in the subdivision. All places marked in the map are linked in the larger full screen map.

Demographics
As per the 2011 Census of India, Gojaldoba Tea Garden had a total population of 5,184.  There were 2,680 (52%) males and 2,054 (48%) females. There were 687 persons in the age range of 0 to 6 years. The total number of literate people in Gojaldoba Tea Garden was 3,166 (70.40% of the population over 6 years).

Tourism

In 1985 Gajoldoba Teesta Barrage built for irrigation purposes, with its reservoir has become a popular tourist attraction and bird watching centre. Baikunthapur Forest, surrounding the reservoir, carries a myth that Lord Krishna, along with his principal wife and queen Rukmani, chose the forest as their hiding place.

References

Villages in Jalpaiguri district